The presidential election is scheduled to be held in Georgia in 2024. This will be the 8th presidential election in Georgia's history. The last presidential election, held in 2018, resulted in the election of Salome Zurabishvili.

Electoral system

In 2017, the Parliament of Georgia adopted the constitutional amendments with 117 voting in favor and two against. The new legislation abolished direct presidential elections starting from 2024. President Giorgi Margvelashvili vetoed the constitutional amendment on 9 October, describing it as an "anti-people constitution". Parliament overrode his veto on 13 October. The constitutional amendments went into effect after the 2018 Georgian presidential election and the inauguration of President Salome Zurabishvili on 16 December 2018. After 2018, presidents will be elected by the 300-member College of Electors, the composition of which will be approved by the Central Election Commission. It will include all members of the Parliament of Georgia, the legislative bodies of the Autonomous Republics of Abkhazia and Adjara, and nominees of the respective political parties from among the representative bodies of local self-governments.

The President of Georgia is the ceremonial head of state of Georgia as well as the commander-in-chief of the Defense Forces. In 2013, a series of constitutional amendments passed in the Parliament of Georgia from 2010 to 2013 entered into force, finalizing Georgia's transition to a parliamentary republic. The president's executive powers were significantly curtailed in favor of the Prime Minister.

The President of Georgia will be elected for a term of 5 years, without debates and by open ballot. The same person can be elected President of Georgia only twice. Any citizen of Georgia having the electoral right, who has attained the age of 40 and who has lived in Georgia for at least 15 years, is eligible to run for presidency, needing backing of at least 30 members of the Electoral College to be nominated.

References

2024 in Georgia (country)
Georgia
Presidential elections in Georgia (country)